WWII: The Long Road Home is a 2017 World War II biographical drama adventure film written and directed by Elliott Hasler. Created between the ages of 14 and 16 whilst Hasler was still at school, the film centres on the story of his own great-grandfather's experiences as an escaped prisoner of war in Italy. Released when Hasler was 16, WWII: The Long Road Home premiered at the Brighton and Edinburgh festivals in 2017 and was praised by critics for the vision of the project in relation to Hasler's age.

The film was produced by Relsah Films and distributed by 101 Films International and 3 Wolves.

Plot 
Private Charlie Standing of the Royal Hampshire Regiment is stationed at a remote outpost at Cuckmere Haven, overlooking the Seven Sisters along the south coast of England. He cycles back to Brighton where he meets his soon-to-be-wife Ivy 'Tup' Standing and they go for a countryside picnic. A montage begins showing the development of their relationship and the birth of their son, Terry. Charlie later meets up with fellow soldier Private Andrew Grimes, who tells him they are to be sent to North Africa. A distraught Tup confronts Charlie the night before he is due to leave; he tries to clam the situation by professing to her that he will return home, despite his father being killed in World War I. The next morning Tup sees him off at the station and he subsequently boards a ship bound for Africa.

At the British HQ in Sidi Nsir, Tunisia Charlie and Grimes are told they are to take part in a risky reconnaissance mission as a prelude to the anticipated arrival of German soldiers. They head out into the desert in a Jeep under the command of Captain Thompson and Sergeant Milton. After suffering a breakdown the group is attacked by German soldiers, resulting in the deaths of both Thompson and Milton which forces Charlie and Grimes to surrender themselves.

Now prisoners of war, they are transported to a POW camp in Capua, Southern Italy. The soldiers lament the poor conditions at the camp and soon the boredom begins to degrade them. As the British claim victory in the North African Campaign, the soldiers are transported north to another prison camp in Laterina, Tuscany. Here they are informed by the Italian Commander of Italy's decision to capitulate. As a result, the POWs are now free but are instructed by the British Camp Commander, Major Rawford, to await the Allies' arrival at the camp. Charlie sensing something is wrong pleads with Grimes to flee the camp with him, however Grimes refuses and Charlie departs alone.

Back in England, Tup flicks through a series of letters marked return-to-sender and ponders over the fate of her husband. Charlie walks across the Italian countryside alone, eventually arriving at a rural farmhouse which he breaks into and steals food, fleeing as the owner returns. The next morning he is discovered by two Italian peasants who decide to help him. Sometime later as winter approaches, the Germans arrive and Charlie is forced into the mountains where he hides out in a remote cave. One morning a German stumbles across the hiding place and Charlie is forced to kill him. That night an aerial bombardment takes place of the surrounding area, Charlie watching from the cave decides it is time to move on.

With the onset of winter he falls ill and collapses in a forest. He is rescued by a mute Italian shepherd, Giovanni, who nurses him back to health and escorts him to the convent in Viterbo, where he waits out the winter. Here he pens a letter to Tup in which he laments the cost of the war upon himself and its destruction of the beauty that surrounds him. Once again the Germans catch up with him and Charlie is forced back out on the run.

Meanwhile, Tup meets Canadian Officer, Michael Romero, whom she agrees to a date with. As the two bond, she begins to feel guilty and ends their relationship.

The summer arrives and back in Italy, Charlie is joined by a lone Italian partisan, Aldo, who seeks revenge for the death of his family at the hands of the fascists. They travel together for a while and form a friendly bond, until one morning Charlie discovers the partisan hanged from a tree. The German soldiers again catch up with Charlie and he flees into the forest where they discover him and a chase ensues. Surrounded on all sides by German soldiers, Charlie is once again pressed to surrender. However suddenly an artillery bombardment of the forest begins, allowing Charlie to escape in the ensuing chaos. War-weary and bedraggled, Charlie wanders through a ruined building and is subsequently rescued by a squad of American fifth army soldiers.

Tup and Terry arrive by an artillery gun which looks out over the harbour, and watch as Charlie arrives back home aboard a warship. Victory in Europe is declared and Charlie watches the celebrations in Trafalgar Square. He struggles to adjust to life back in England and becomes emotionally detached from his wife and son, spending his time working on the railways. He writes a letter to Tup in which he apologises for his actions and declares his wishes to be with her.

Now in 1999, an older Tup reads the letter and then along with the rest of Charlie's letters, places them into his coffin. After the funeral, Tup travels to Cuckmere Haven to scatter the ashes. She pauses and stares out at the white cliffs, reminiscing of a trip there with Charlie and Terry after the war. She then turns and walks away.

Cast 
 Elliott Hasler as Private Charlie Standing 
 Alice Rogers as Ivy 'Tup' Standing 
 David Aitchison as Private Andrew Grimes
 Luigi Patti Del Pirano Li-Castri as Aldo 
 Mike Skinner as Captain Thompson
 Owen Oldroyd as Sergeant Milton 
 Eamonn Breen as Major Rawford
 Pete Walsh as Michael Romero 
 David Hasler as Giovanni

Production

Writing 
Hasler began writing the film at the age of fourteen, having been making short films since the age of ten. Having never met his great-grandfather who died in 1999 (a year before Hasler was born), much of the story was passed down to him by his grandfather in the form of small stories about Charlie Standing's escapades. Hasler has stated how these stories captured his imagination and were what led to his decision to make the film.

The script was completed in the summer of 2014 and filming began in October of that year.

Filming 
Filming began on 25 October 2014 in Turkey. Hasler was on holiday there at the time and as he was starring in the film decided to shoot scenes there for the film. Due to the three year production on the film, this process was also replicated in Italy, Spain and France, with the latter country providing locations for crucial scenes for the winter sections of the film. The majority of filming took place in Brighton, England and the surrounding area in Sussex. Because of the low budget nature of the film and as Hasler was still a schoolboy, the cast is composed of non-professional actors, made up of family and friends. Scenes were shot at Pippingford Park in July 2016, which also served as a location on the television series Band of Brothers.

Filming wrapped in March 2017 after three years of production. Hasler edited the film himself and the score was composed by musician Jamie Scarratt, who was also 16 at the time of production.

Release and reception 
The film premiered in May 2017 at the Brighton Fringe Festival, the hometown of Hasler, selling out six of seven screenings under the original title of Charlie's Letters. In August 2017 the film was shown as part of the Edinburgh Fringe Festival. The film was also shown as part of a special screening for veterans of the battle of Sidi Nsir at the Vue cinema in Southampton.

In 2020 the film was picked up for distribution by 101 Films International and retitled to WWII: The Long Road Home. It was given a home video and VOD release in the United Kingdom in October 2020 and received US distribution in February 2021.

Critical response 
WWII: The Long Road Home was praised critics for the scope and scale of the production in relation to Hasler's age and the film's low budget. Tim Walker of The New European called the film "glossy and assured".

Critic David Luhrssen wrote the film "makes decent use of its modest budget, avoiding SFX and big set pieces through careful editing and camera angles and use of sound". While Culture Trip's Graham Fuller called it "a miracle achievement for a schoolboy director".

References 

2017 films
British historical drama films
British independent films
British biographical drama films
North African campaign films
British World War II films
World War II prisoner of war films
World War II films based on actual events
2010s English-language films
2010s British films